Japanese football in 1931.

Emperor's Cup

Births
April 2 - Reizo Fukuhara
April 28 - Takashi Mizuno
July 8 - Arawa Kimura
August 2 - Takashi Takabayashi
August 16 - Kakuichi Mimura
August 28 - Shunichiro Okano
September 19 - Hiroto Muraoka
October 7 - Ryuzo Hiraki

External links

 
Seasons in Japanese football